Slob or SLOB may refer to:

 Slob, United States Virgin Islands, a settlement
 Arie Slob (born 1961), Dutch politician
 Jan Janz Slop or Jan Slob (1643–1727), Dutch Golden Age painter
 S.L.O.B., debut full-length album by American deathcore band Dr. Acula
 "Slob", a song on the album Maladroit by Weezer
 "Slob", derogatory slang term for a member of a Bloods gang
 "Slob", "slobland", a dialect term for mudflats, mostly Irish

In computing:

 slob (KDF9), syllabic octal notation as used in conjunction with the English Electric KDF9 computer
 SLOB (Linux), a memory allocation mechanism in Linux Kernel

See also
 Slobodan